Arts Commons (Formerly EPCOR Centre for the Performing Arts) is a multi-venue arts centre in downtown Calgary, Alberta, Canada, located in the Olympic Plaza Cultural District.

It is one of the three largest arts centres in Canada and is home to six resident companies, including Alberta Theatre Projects, Arts Commons Presents, Calgary Philharmonic Orchestra, Downstage, One Yellow Rabbit, and Theatre Calgary. Approximately 200 community groups make use of Arts Commons facilities every year, hosting everything from annual general meetings, graduations, cultural events, weddings, and more. In addition to a variety of performance and gathering spaces, Arts Commons also houses rehearsal halls, theatre workshops, offices, meeting rooms, a café, and visual and media arts galleries.

History

The oldest part of the city block that houses Arts Commons is the Burns Building, named after noted Calgarian Pat Burns.  Construction began in April 1912 and was completed at a cost of $350,000. In the late 1970s, the demolition of the Burns Building became a possibility, because it was on land needed for the construction of the Calgary Centre for the Performing Arts. Demolition proposals were defeated by the Calgary City Council by one vote, and, along with the Calgary Public Building (built in 1930/31 at a cost of almost $2 million), the building was incorporated into the plan for the Arts Centre. In 1979, the Public Building was bought by the City of Calgary for $3.8 million and its upper floors are still occupied by City of Calgary offices.

The newly created Centre was officially opened on 14 September 1985 by the then Premier of Alberta Peter Lougheed.  After a donation by EPCOR, an Edmonton, Alberta-based utilities company, the name was changed to the EPCOR CENTRE for the Performing Arts on 1 May 2001.

On 17 December 2014, at the Annual General Meeting, it was publicly announced that the performing arts centre would be rebranded as Arts Commons, the name which represents "the Arts" and which expands the organization's offerings beyond the performing arts to a wider variety of arts and genres. "Commons" is derived from the old town square concept where ideas are shared, people from all walks of life gather, and different perspectives are welcomed.

Amenities offered
Almost 400,000 people attend 1800-plus performances and events each year at the Arts Commons, including productions and presentations by the six resident companies, including Alberta Theatre Projects, Arts Commons Presents, Calgary Philharmonic Orchestra, Downstage, One Yellow Rabbit, and Theatre Calgary. Such events include live theatre, dance, spoken word and readings, children's events, experimental theatre, art exhibits, public forums, weddings, training sessions, meetings, arts education activities, sporting events and competition, award ceremonies and live music concerts ranging from symphonic to jazz, to folk, blues, world, and rock.

Performance and other facilities
 Jack Singer Concert Hall, with 1,800 seats, “the Jack” is the largest venue in the building. Suspended above the stage is a 185,000-pound laminated spruce-wood acoustical canopy, which can be raised or lowered to tune the hall according to the specific needs of each performer. Named for Jack Singer, the Concert Hall is the permanent home of the Calgary Philharmonic Orchestra, which employs 65 full-time musicians, and the 6,040-pipe Carthy Organ.
 Max Bell Theatre is a 750-seat theatre and is home to Theatre Calgary.
 Martha Cohen Theatre is a 418-seat theatre and is home to Alberta Theatre Projects (ATP). 
 Big Secret Theatre is a 190-seat theatre and is home to One Yellow Rabbit.
 Engineered Air Theatre is used for concerts, films, plays, weddings, receptions, and galas. Can seat up to 185 theatre-style.
 Motel Theatre is a 50-seat black box, multi-purpose venue used for plays, experimental theatre and performance art and is home to Downstage.

Activities and performances
Arts Commons Presents is the presenting arm of Arts Commons. Series presented include the BD&P World Stage, Classic Albums Live, National Geographic Live, PCL Blues, and TD Jazz. Arts Commons also offers Arts Education programs (One Day Arts School, The ConocoPhillips Hub for Inspired Learning and Artist-in-Residence). Arts Commons also houses five additional resident companies, including: Alberta Theatre Projects, Calgary Philharmonic Orchestra, Downstage, One Yellow Rabbit, and Theatre Calgary, all of which program their own individual seasons within the spaces of Arts Commons. Collaboration between companies is common and the 6 companies together form the Arts Commons ecosystem.

Arts Commons also provides free events for the community, including Arts Commons Cabarets, National Indigenous Peoples Day celebrations.

Community Engagement

The 2018–19 season marked the official establishment of Producing and Engagement at Arts Commons, which supports equitable and inclusive opportunities for diverse communities in Calgary to converse, create, and celebrate. Through transparent and flexible partnerships, Arts Commons works with established organizations and grassroots groups to create arts-based workshops that create connections to amplify the voices of underserved communities. This includes the TD Incubator program, launched in fall 2021.

TD Incubator aims to accelerate the careers of 20-35 interdisciplinary artists each season who reflect the diversity and vibrancy of Calgary. Artists are increasingly moving between and blending artistic forms, genres, and industries to better reflect, create connections, and make sense of the complex world around us and Arts Commons is uniquely positioned to support these artists through performance opportunities and media art exhibitions. Alumni from the program include Wakefield Brewster, 2022-2024 Calgary Poet Laureate.

Arts Commons Transformation Project 
Since Arts Commons opened in 1985, Calgary's population has nearly tripled and the amount of resident companies that call our complex home has doubled. As importantly, we welcome approximately 200 local groups into our building every year, providing the necessary spaces and support to build community. With the ongoing growth of our community, we have maximized all available capacity to achieve revenues from our current venues, turning away hundreds of revenue-generating events every year. If we are to continue to increase earned revenues and be financially sustainable over the long term, we must add more revenue generating spaces. ACT is positioned to meet this challenge.

With over 10 years of research, development, and community-engagement behind it, the Arts Commons Transformation (ACT) project includes two phases to achieve a new, vibrant campus in the heart of Calgary:

Phase 1 is the Expansion, which will provide the much-needed increase in the number of venues and spaces (adding an additional 25%-35% in seating capacity) necessary to meet growing market demand and community aspirations.

Phase 2 is the Modernization of the existing 560,000 square foot facility, elevating the public's experience through upgraded amenities and technology, while also addressing over $71M in lifecycle work.

Jordan Peterson Controversy 
After the announcement of the University of Toronto professor Jordan Peterson giving a lecture at Arts Commons was announced, several Calgarian art groups addressed an open letter to the Arts Commons' Board of Directors on 24 July 2018. The letter demanded that the event be canceled, that they provide diversity training for their staff, and issue a public apology to the "2SLGBTQIA community". It expressed the "deep shock and disappointment" that the artists and organizations signing the letter felt over Arts Commons' choice to host the speaker, who in the past has been criticized for his online and public arguments against government mandated speech laws and his opposition to Bill C-16. The letter was signed by staff of several small artist run centres, including Untitled Art Society, TRUCK Contemporary Art in Calgary, Stride Gallery, The New Gallery, other organizations such as the M:ST Performance Artist Festival Society and VOICESYYC, and over 1200 individual signatures. A responding statement written by the CEO of Arts Commons at the time, Johann Zietsman, expressed Arts Commons' support for free speech which meant, "not censoring someone because we don't agree with what they have to say." The event was not canceled and was held on 27 July 2018.

Censorship Controversy 
In early September 2018, The New Gallery released a statement describing the circumstances of what it said was censorship of trans artist, Beck Gilmer-Osborne, exhibiting in a vitrine space within the Arts Commons building and Calgary +15 Network. The New Gallery's said Arts Commons had turned off the 3-channel video work being exhibited in the space because, Arts Commons said, it contained swearing and nudity that had garnered complaints from patrons. On 29 August 2018 Arts Commons sent The New Gallery a letter saying the video work would have to be edited to remove the nudity and coarse language or the artwork would be taken down. In response, on 8 September 2018, The New Gallery provided an open-letter written by the exhibiting artist, B.G-Osborne, in which Osborne stated that "rather than re-edit and censor my work to comfort certain viewers who are offended by the very banal acts of swearing and non-sexual nudity, I have decided to remove the piece from the space entirely." Osborne said it was ironic that an artwork that uses the imagery of cisgender actors playing trans characters to criticize the offensive portrayal of trans people was being criticized as offensive. Arts Commons owns the walkway and vitrine spaces but each is individually curated by a different gallery or art organization. Arts Commons programming director Jennifer Johnson said in an emailed statement to CBC that "while Arts Commons believes the piece, A Thousand Cuts, has merit, the language and images contained in the video and audio component are not a fit with our commitment to creating a public space for all."

In 2006, Arts Commons (at the time the "EPCOR CENTRE for the Performing Arts") also received criticism for censoring a transgender artist who was exhibiting in the same +15 walk way space with another of Calgary's artist run centre galleries, TRUCK Contemporary Art in Calgary. A temporary wall was installed throughout the length of the walk way that blocked the entire view of the vitrine space save for a smaller entrance that could be accessed on the opposite side of the walk way. This wall was installed without speaking to the artist, Edie Fake, or staff from TRUCK. The artwork was titled, 'Gaylord Phoenix in the Flower Temple' and depicted a cartoon of a gender-fluid man, touching his genitals (drawn as a noodle with paisley patterns).

See also
List of concert halls

References

External links

Arts Commons

Performing arts centres in Canada
Buildings and structures in Calgary
Theatre in Calgary
Music venues in Calgary